The Little Paris Kitchen: Cooking with Rachel Khoo is a television cookery programme starring food writer and cook Rachel Khoo which first broadcast on BBC Two in the UK in March–April 2012. The show follows Khoo from her tiny kitchen in Paris, France, as she introduces the audience to "French food cooked simply, like Parisians do at home".

Description

Rachel Khoo, alumna of Le Cordon Bleu, welcomes the audience to the two-person smallest restaurant in Paris, cooks a number of classic French dishes in her tiny flat in Belleville, Paris, and introduces the viewer to "French food the way Parisians cook and eat it".

Reception
John Crace of The Guardian described the first episode of The Little Paris Kitchen as 
"an uneasy mishmash: the format was, too; like so many other cooking programmes, it tried to cram in a bit of forced travelogue to add local colour, with hints of cultural appropriation". In another review of the first episode, Christopher Hooten wrote: "Khoo’s girl-in-the-big-city charm and hearty recipes make this series difficult to dislike", and remarked the show spliced recipes with images of Paris.

Episodes

References

External links
 

Episode list using the default LineColor
BBC television documentaries
2012 British television series debuts
2012 British television series endings
2010s British cooking television series
BBC high definition shows
British cooking television shows
English-language television shows